Florent le Comte (1655–1712), was a French writer and engraver.

Biography
He wrote a comprehensive book about art Cabinet des singularitez which the historian Arnold Houbraken used as a source for Dutch painters active in France, along with similar books on artists by Roger de Piles and André Felibien. Though Houbraken quotes the French title, in his biographical sketch of Romeyn de Hooghe he includes a long citation in Dutch from the Dutch translation.

According to the RKD his Cabinet des singularitez written in 1699 was translated into Dutch in 1708. Though he called himself a painter and sculptor, no works are known.

References

Cabinet des singularitez d'architecture, peinture, sculpture, Tome Troisieme, by Florent Lecomte, Lambert Marchant, Brussels, 1702
 Het konst-cabinet der bouw-, schilder-, beeldhouw- en graveerkunde, of, Inleiding tot de kennis dier fraaije weetenschappen, vervat in de schilderyen, stand-beelden en prenten: behelzende, behalven een beknopte leevensbeschryving der aloude schilders en beeldhouwers, bennevens de catalogi hunner werken : verrykt met een verhandeling over het glas-schilderen, een vertoog over het etzen, en wat tot het leeren en oeffenen dier kundigheid vereist word en andere weetenswaardige zaaken, by Florent Le Comte, Frans de Bakker, C. V. Swinderen, Arnoldus Lobedanius, 1744, on archive.org
Het konst-cabinet der bouw- schilder- beeldhouw- en graveerkunde, Volume II, by Florentyn le Comte, Dordrecht, 1761, on Google books

1655 births
1712 deaths
18th-century French people
French art historians
French male non-fiction writers